Kamianets Okruha was one of the administrative units (an okruha) of the Ukrainian Soviet Socialist Republic from 1923–1930 and again from 1935–1937. 

A large portion of the former okruhas territory is now part of the Kamianets-Podilskyi Raion (district) of the Khmelnytskyi Oblast. Its administrative center was located in the city of Kamianets-Podilsk.

History
The Kamianets Okruha was first created in 1923 as part of the Podolia Governorate, a remnant of the former Russian Empire. In 1925, all of the governorates throughout the Ukrainian SSR were abolished, and okruhas became the first level of administrative division. In 1926, the okruha was divided into a total of 16 raions. Because the Ukrainian Soviet authorities felt the system of administrative division was ineffective and hard to administer, the Kamianets Okruha along with all of the other okras were done away with completely in 1930.

However, the okruha was re-established in 1935 as a border district of the Vinnytsia Oblast consisting of a total of 8 districts. In 1937, the okruha was yet again abolished, and its territory was reassigned to districts of the newly created Kamianets-Podilskyi Oblast.

Demographics
According to the results of the 1926 Soviet census, the Kamianets Okruha had a population of 769,999. Of these 124,750 were residents in urban areas, compared to 645,249 for rural areas. 

In terms of ethnicity, 82.2 percent were Ukrainians, 8.9 percent were Russians, 4.3 percent were Jews, 3 percent were Moldovans, with the rest of the ethnic groups adding up to the remaining 1 percent.

See also
 Administrative divisions of the Ukrainian SSR
 Administrative divisions of Khmelnytskyi Oblast

References



Okruhas of Ukraine
History of Khmelnytskyi Oblast
History of Vinnytsia Oblast
Kamianets-Podilskyi Raion

States and territories established in 1923
States and territories disestablished in 1930
States and territories established in 1935
States and territories disestablished in 1937
1923 establishments in Ukraine
1937 disestablishments in Ukraine